Nammal is a 2002 Indian Malayalam-language film.

Nammal may also refer to:
 Nammal, Khyber Pakhtunkhwa, a town in Abbotabad District, Khyber Pakhtunkhwa, Pakistan
 Namal, a town in Mianwali District, Punjab, Pakistan
 Nammal Lake
 Nammal railway station

See also 
 
 Namal (disambiguation)